The Two Mouseketeers is a 1952 American one-reel animated cartoon and is the 65th Tom and Jerry short, produced in Technicolor and released to theatres on March 15, 1952 by Metro-Goldwyn-Mayer. It was produced by Fred Quimby and directed by William Hanna and Joseph Barbera. The short is a spoof of Alexandre Dumas' 1844 novel The Three Musketeers and its film adaptations, featuring mice Jerry and his best friend Nibbles as "Mouseketeers" trying to raid the French king's banquet table, which is protected by Tom as a guard. Three years after the cartoon's release, the term "Mousketeer" was also used to refer to the child cast members of the television show, The Mickey Mouse Club.

The cartoon was animated by Ed Barge, Kenneth Muse and Irven Spence. Musical supervision was done by Scott Bradley, using a version of the theme music by Nelson Eddy and the Sportsmen Quartet named "Soldier of Fortune", from the film The Girl of the Golden West. The character of Nibbles speaks French in this short and was voiced by six-year-old Francoise Brun-Cottan.

The Two Mouseketeers won the series' sixth Oscar for Best Animated Short Film. Such was the cartoon's success, that Hanna and Barbera created a total of four adventures in the Mouseketeers series; the second, 1954's Touché, Pussy Cat! received an Oscar nomination.

The success of the short led to three more Mouseketeers shorts: Touché, Pussycat! (1954), Tom and Chérie (1955) and Royal Cat Nap (1958). The premise was also featured in comic books from Dell Comics.

Plot
In 17th century Delhi, Mouseketeers Jerry and his friend Nibbles decide to help themselves to a lavish royal banquet. Tom, in the service of the cardinal, has been ordered to guard the spread from the King's Mouseketeers with his life, under threat of execution by guillotine if he fails. Jerry and Nibbles enter the castle hall through a stained-glass window. Jerry releases the rear-end cover on a suit of armor, making a small drawbridge to the windowsill; they sneak into the armor, emerge from the helmet's visor and then parachute onto the table. Jerry lands first, followed by Nibbles who lands on a roasted warthog's mouth, causing him to get stuck. Jerry pulls Nibbles out of its mouth. Afterwards, Nibbles goes inside a big block of cheese, pretending it is a tower with only a few floors. Nibbles waves to Jerry on the top-floor but loses his balance and he falls on an unopened banana, which opens and shoots into Jerry's mouth, causing the brown mouse's body to become banana-shaped. They then unwittingly catch Tom's attention by showering him with champagne after trying to open the cork with the roasted pig's tail.

After hiding from Tom by wearing white paper decorations from the standing rib roast to look like two ribs, Jerry runs off, but little Nibbles begins making a ham sandwich while singing "Alouette" to himself. Tom sneaks up behind him and pokes him with his rapier, and the angry Nibbles yells in protest: "Hé! Attention là! Vous pourriez faire mal à quelqu'un, Monsieur Pussycat! Pussycat? Au secours! Au secours! Le pussycat! Le pussycat! Au secours du pussycat!" ("Hey! Watch it! You could hurt someone like that, Mister Pussycat! Pussycat? Help! Help! The pussycat! The pussycat! Save me from the pussycat!"). But before he can get away, Tom captures him by putting his rapier through Nibbles' tabard. Failing to escape, Nibbles greets him ("Bonjour, Monsieur Pussycat."). Jerry manages to stab Tom in the rear-end to rescue Nibbles, and throws a custard in Tom's face for good measure. A sword fight then ensues, ending with Tom catching Jerry. Nibbles tips a halberd toward Tom and it shaves the tabard and all the fur off the cat's back from head to hind end, revealing a ruffled white underwear.

Nibbles runs away, but is sent flying by Tom into a full wine glass – but Jerry saves him by hurling a tomato at Tom, followed by multiple vegetables and meat chunks. After impaling them all on his rapier, Tom then heats and eats them like a shish kebab. Nibbles, now drunk, climbs out of the glass. He pokes Tom in the rear-end, making him yowl and jump up in pain, as Nibbles waves his sword, yelling: "Touché, pussycat!" But as he runs away, Tom catches him. Jerry makes the save by hitting Tom on the head with a mace so hard that the cat falls through the table, before having another swordfight between Tom and Jerry. While this goes on, Nibbles brings along a cannon and stuffs it with everything on the banquet table. Just as Tom catches Jerry, Nibbles lights the cannon and it violently explodes.

As the smoke disappears, Jerry and Nibbles are seen walking triumphantly down the street with some of the stolen banquet food. Suddenly, they look up and see a guillotine in the distance with drumroll,  the blade rises up and comes down, strongly suggesting that Tom has been executed (although off-screen, in order to comply with the Hays Code). Both mice gulp, and Nibbles sighs: "Pauvre, pauvre pussycat." ("Poor, poor pussycat."). Then he shrugs, saying: "C'est la guerre!" ("That's war!"). After that, the two Mouseketeers continue their victory march.

Production
Directed by William Hanna and Joseph Barbera
Animation: Ed Barge, Kenneth Muse, Irven Spence
Layout: Dick Bickenbach
Music: Scott Bradley
Produced by: Fred Quimby

Availability
VHS
 Quest for Camelot
DVD
 Tom and Jerry's Greatest Chases, Vol. 3
 Tom and Jerry Spotlight Collection Vol. 1, Disc Two
Warner Bros. Home Entertainment Academy Awards Animation Collection: 15 Winners (restored)

References

External links

 
 

1952 animated films
1952 short films
1950s American animated films
1950s animated short films
1952 comedy films
Best Animated Short Academy Award winners
Films based on The Three Musketeers
Short films directed by Joseph Barbera
Short films directed by William Hanna
Tom and Jerry short films
Films scored by Scott Bradley
Animated films set in Paris
1950s English-language films
1950s French-language films
Metro-Goldwyn-Mayer short films
Metro-Goldwyn-Mayer animated short films
Films produced by Fred Quimby
Metro-Goldwyn-Mayer cartoon studio short films
1950s multilingual films
American multilingual films
American comedy short films
American animated short films
French-language American films
Animated films about cats
Animated films about mice